Daniel Abraham Zaret (11 April 1891 – 13 October 1984) was a Russian-born, naturalized American citizen and spy.

War experience 

Zaret registered for the World War II draft on April 27, 1942. At that time, he was living in rural Cecil County, Maryland and was employed by Triumph Explosives in Elkton, Maryland. Up to August 1943, Zaret was employed by various explosives factories, including a job as assistant director at a factory in Williamsport, Pennsylvania in 1943. He later took a position as production safety inspector in the Explosives Division of the War Department in Chicago.

Venona 
Zaret is referenced in the following Venona project decrypt:

 Venona 1325 GRU New York to Moscow, 11 August 1943.

Background 
Zaret was born Daniel Abraham Zaretsky on April 11, 1891 in Simferopol, Crimea, Russia to Abraham Zaretsky. He immigrated to the United States via Liverpool, England in April 1906. Zaret claimed to have lived in Arkansas, Illinois, Delaware, New Jersey, and New York between 1906 and 1921. He became a naturalized citizen on November 12, 1917.

During World War I, Zaret served in the United States Army, November 18, 1917 to January 27, 1919; he was living in Wilmington, Delaware when he registered for the draft. In 1921, Zaret was living in Brooklyn, New York and was employed as a jewelry merchant.

Zaret died 13 October 1984 in Saint Petersburg, Florida.

References

Bibliography 

1890s births
1984 deaths
American spies
American spies for the Soviet Union
American people in the Venona papers
American people of the Spanish Civil War
Espionage in the United States
Russian people of the Spanish Civil War
People from Cecil County, Maryland
Naturalized citizens of the United States
Emigrants from the Russian Empire to the United States